Alfred Heckmann (25 June 1914 – 21 July 1993) was a Luftwaffe flying ace of World War II. A flying ace or fighter ace is a military aviator credited with shooting down five or more enemy aircraft during aerial combat. He was also a recipient of the Knight's Cross of the Iron Cross. The Knight's Cross of the Iron Cross was awarded to recognise extreme battlefield bravery or successful military leadership.

Biography
Alfred Heckmann was born 25 June 1914 at Bochum-Langendreer. In early 1940, Unteroffizier Heckmann was posted to 5. Staffel of Jagdgeschwader 3 (5./JG 3—5th squadron of the 3rd fighter wing). He claimed his first victory in June 1940, when he shot down a French Morane MS 406 fighter over Abbeville. He added two Supermarine Spitfires during the Battle of Britain. Feldwebel Heckmann then participated in Operation Barbarossa, the German invasion of the Soviet Union, and claimed another 24 victories up to October 1941, when the unit re-equipped with the new Messerschmitt Bf 109 F-4.

The II. Gruppe of JG 3 (II./JG 3—2nd group of the 3rd fighter wing) was relocated to Sicily in January 1942, and Heckmann flew over Malta without claiming any aerial victories. II./JG 3 returned to the Eastern Front in June 1942. In July Oberfeldwebel Heckmann claimed 17 Soviet aircraft, including four Douglas Boston bombers shot down on 10 July. He was awarded the Knight's Cross of the Iron Cross in September 1942.

In October 1942, Heckmann was transferred to 1. Staffel of Jagdgeschwader 26 "Schlageter" (1./JG 26—1st squadron of the 26th fighter wing) on the Channel front. In winter 1943, he moved with I./JG 26 (1st group of the 26th fighter wing) back to the Eastern Front in an exchange for III./Jagdgeschwader 54 (3rd group of the 54th fighter wing) who transferred to the West. In the 14 weeks the Gruppe was based in Russia Oberfeldwebel Heckmann claimed four victories; all Il-2 Stormovik's. In February 1943, Heckmann took up instructing duties with Ergänzungs-Jagdgruppe Ost.

He returned to 1./JG 26 in July before being appointed Staffelkapitän of 3./JG 26 (3rd squadron of the 26th fighter wing) in January 1944. On 21 September, I./JG 26 attacked a formation of RAF C-47 Douglas Dakota transports over 's-Hertogenbosch en route to supply the Allied aerial landings at Arnhem. Heckmann claimed four shot down.

On 1 January 1945, Heckmann led 23 Focke-Wulf Fw 190 D-9s of 3./JG 26 in Operation Bodenplatte, the attack on the Allied airfields in the Netherlands and Belgium. On 27 March 1945, Heckmann was made Staffelkapitän of 5./JG 26. Heckmann's stay was short as he was transferred to Jagdverband 44 at München-Reim on 14 April 1945, serving with the unit until the end of the war.

"Fred" Heckmann flew over 600 missions, claiming 71 victories. He recorded 54 victories over the Eastern Front. Of his 17 victories recorded over the Western Front, 3 were four-engine bombers.

Summary of career

Aerial victory claims
According to US historian David T. Zabecki, Heckmann was credited with 71 aerial victories.

Awards
 Ehrenpokal der Luftwaffe (11 August 1941)
 German Cross in Gold on 9 April 1942 as Oberfeldwebel in the 5./Jagdgeschwader 3
 Knight's Cross of the Iron Cross on 19 September 1942 as Oberfeldwebel and pilot in the 4./Jagdgeschwader 3 "Udet"

Notes

References

Citations

Bibliography

 
 
 
 
 
 

1914 births
1993 deaths
Luftwaffe pilots
German World War II flying aces
Recipients of the Gold German Cross
Recipients of the Knight's Cross of the Iron Cross
People from the Province of Westphalia
Military personnel from Bochum